A bifilar dial is a type of sundial invented by the German mathematician Hugo Michnik in 1922. It has two non-touching threads parallel to the dial.  Usually the second thread is orthogonal-(perpendicular) to the first.

The intersection of the two threads' shadows gives the local apparent time.

When the threads have the correctly calculated separation, the hour-lines on the horizontal surface are uniformly drawn. The angle between successive hour-lines is constant. The hour-lines for successive hours are 15 degrees apart.

History
The bifilar dial was invented in April 1922 by the mathematician and maths teacher, Hugo Michnik, from Beuthen, Upper Silesia. He studied the horizontal dial- starting on a conventional XYZ cartesian framework and building up a general projection which he states was an exceptional case of a Steiner transformation. He related the trace of the sun to conic sections and the angle on the dial-plate to the hour angle and the calculation of local apparent time, using conventional hours and the historic Italian and Babylonian hours.  He refers in the paper, to a previous publication on the theory of sundials in 1914.

His method has been applied to vertical near-declinant dials, and a more general declining-reclining dial.

Work has been subsequently done by Dominique Collin.

Horizontal bifilar dial 
This was the dial that Hugo Michnik invented and studied. By simplifying the general example so:
 the wires cross orthogonally- one running north-south and the other east-west
the shadow is thrown on a dial-plate marked out like a simple equatorial sundial.

The proof 
The first wire  is orientated north-south at a constant distance  from the dial plate 

In this proof  (pronounced phi) is the latitude of the dial plate.

Point  is the point on the dial plate directly under the two wires' intersection. That point is the origin of the X,Y co-ordinate system referred to below.

The X-axis is the east–west line passing through the origin. The Y-axis is the north–south line passing through the origin. The positive Y direction is northward.

In its simplest form this equation is written:

This relation shows that the hour traces are indeed line segments and the meeting-point of these line segments is the point :

Special case
If one arranges the two wire heights  and  such :

 

then the equation for the hour lines can be simply written as:

at all times,  the intersection  of the shadows on the dial plate  is such that the angle  is equal to the hour angle  of the sun so thus represents solar time.

So provided the sundial respects the la condition  the trace of the sun corresponds to the hour-angle shown by lines (rays) centred on the point  and the 13 rays that correspond to the hours 6:00, 7:00, 8:00, 9:00... 15:00, 16:00, 17:00, 18:00 are regularly spaced at a constant angle of 15°, about point C.

A practical example
A London dial is the name given to dials set for 51° 30' N. A simple London bifilar dial has a dial plate with 13 line segments drawn outward from a centre-point C, with each hour's line drawn 15° clockwise from the previous hour's line. The midday line is aligned towards the north.

The north–south wire is 10 cm above the midday line. That east-west wire is placed at a height of 7.826 centimeters- equivalent to 10 cm x sin(51° 30'). This passes through C. The east–west wire crosses the north–south wire 6.275 cm north of the centre-point C- that being the equivalent of - 7.826 divided by tan (51° 30').

Reclining-declining bifilar sundials 

Whether a sundial is a bifilar, or whether it's the familiar flat-dial with a straight style (like the usual horizontal and vertical-declining sundials), making it reclining, vertical-declining, or reclining-declining is exactly the same. The declining or reclining-declining mounting is achieved in exactly the same manner, whether the dial is bifilar, or the usual straight-style flat dial.

For any flat-dial, whether bifilar, or ordinary straight-style, the north celestial pole has a certain altitude, measured from the plane of the dial.

 Effective latitude:If that dial-plane is horizontal, then it's a horizontal dial (bifilar, or straight-style). Then, of course the north celestial pole's altitude, measured from the dial-plane, is the latitude of the location. Well then, if the flat-dial is reclined, declined, or reclined-&-declined, everything is the same as if it the dial were horizontal, with the celestial pole's altitude, measured with respect to the dial-plane, treated as the latitude.
 Dial-North:Likewise, the north celestial pole's longitude, measured with respect to the plane of the dial, with respect to the downward direction (or the direction that a marble would roll, if the dial is reclining) on the dial-face, is the direction that is treated as north, when drawing the hour-lines. I'll call that direction "dial-north".
 Equatorial Longitude (hour-angle) of dial-north:It's necessary to find the equatorial longitude of the dial-north direction (drawn on the dial). In the case of the horizontal dial, of course that's an hour-angle of zero, the south meridian. That determines what time ("dial-north time") is represented by the dial-north line. Other times, before and after that, can then have their lines drawn according to their differences from dial-north time—in the same way as they' be drawn on a horizontal dial-face according to their differences from 12 noon (true solar time).

References
Footnotes

Notes

Bibliography

External links

Sundials